Micheal Zondani Katambo (born 16 September 1969) is a Zambia politician. He is currently a Member of the National Assembly and Minister of Agriculture.

Katambo has also been a Member of Parliament for Masaiti constituency since 2011. Initially he was a member of the Movement for Multi-Party Democracy until 2015, where he switched to the Patriotic Front.

In September 2016 he was appointed Minister of Fisheries and Livestock. A cabinet reshuffle in February 2018 saw him become Minister of Agriculture.

References

Living people
Members of the National Assembly of Zambia
Agriculture ministers of Zambia
1969 births